Malomtó széli stadion is a sports stadium in Cegléd, Hungary. The stadium is home to the association football club Ceglédi VSE. The stadium has a capacity of 4,000.

Attendance

Records
Record Attendance:
 12,500 Cegléd v MTK, February 15, 1989

External links 
Magyarfutball.hu 

Football venues in Hungary
1926 establishments in Hungary
Sports venues completed in 1926